Blue Marine Foundation is a marine conservation organisation. It was founded as a legacy of the 2009 documentary film The End of the Line. It has been involved in establishing marine reserves in the Chagos Archipelago, Lyme Bay and Turneffe Atoll.

History
Filmmaker George Duffield and Chris Gorell Barnes, the executive producer of The End of the Line, co-founded the Blue Marine Foundation, alongside Charles Clover, author of the eponymous book, as a legacy project of the film. It was formed with the aim of fixing what it describes as "the largest solvable problem on the planet – the crisis in the oceans".

Among Blue's most significant achievements was securing the funding needed to enforce the protection of the no-take marine reserve created by the UK government around the Chagos Archipelago in the Indian Ocean. At the time of its creation in 2010, it was the world's biggest marine reserve. The money came from the Bertarelli Foundation and covered the first five years after which the government promised to internalise the costs and enforce the reserve. Henry Bellingham, a UK junior Foreign Office minister, described the initiative as a "great example" of government and the private sector working together and said the reserve would "double the global coverage of the world's oceans benefiting from full protection".

On a smaller scale, BLUE was instrumental in July 2012 in the creation of a unique alliance between fishermen and conservationists in the UK that is designed to protect Lyme Bay, on the southern coast of the UK and part of England's first natural World Heritage Site. Scallopers and dredgers were banned from part of Lyme Bay, an important reef habitat, but overfishing continued. The deal brokered by BLUE and the Lyme Bay Working Group is designed to ensure fishing communities can continue to fish while the fragile ecosystem is protected and conserved.

The charity also played a central role in the creation of a marine reserve around the Turneffe Atoll, off Belize, which is part of the world's biggest coral reef system after the Great Barrier Reef.

In 2022, the organisation was part of a restoration project launched in the Solent.

References

External links 
 Official website

Marine conservation organizations
Environmental organisations based in the United Kingdom
Fisheries conservation organizations
Environmental organizations established in 2010
2010 establishments in the United Kingdom